Patcharaporn Sittisad (born February 20, 1996, in Kalasin) is a Thai indoor volleyball player. She is a current member of the Thailand women's national volleyball team.

Awards

Club 
 2016–17 Thailand League -  Champion, with Supreme Chonburi
 2017 Thai–Denmark Super League -  Champion, with Supreme Chonburi
 2017 Asian Club Championship -  Champion, with Supreme Chonburi
 2017–18 Thailand League -  Champion, with Supreme Chonburi
 2018 Thai–Denmark Super League -  Champion, with Supreme Chonburi
 2018–19 Thailand League -  Runner-Up, with Supreme Chonburi
 2019 Thai–Denmark Super League -  Champion, with Supreme Chonburi

National team

U23 team 
 2017 Asian Championship -  Silver Medal

References

External links
 FIVB Biography

1996 births
Living people
Patcharaporn Sittisad
Patcharaporn Sittisad
Patcharaporn Sittisad
Patcharaporn Sittisad